The yellow steppe lemming (Eolagurus luteus) is a species of rodent in the family Cricetidae.
It is found in China, Kazakhstan, and Mongolia. Its natural habitat is temperate desert.

References

Musser, G. G. and M. D. Carleton. (2005). Superfamily Muroidea. pp. 894–1531 in Mammal Species of the World a Taxonomic and Geographic Reference. D. E. Wilson and D. M. Reeder eds. Johns Hopkins University Press, Baltimore.

Eolagurus
Rodents of China
Mammals of Central Asia
Mammals of Mongolia
Mammals described in 1840
Taxonomy articles created by Polbot